Otero County is a county located in the U.S. state of New Mexico. As of the 2010 census, the population was 63,797. Its county seat is Alamogordo. Its southern boundary is the Texas state line. It is named for Miguel Antonio Otero, the territorial governor when the county was created.

Otero County includes the Alamogordo Micropolitan Statistical Area.

History
The county declared a state of emergency in April 2019 when the federal inspection stations on U.S. Route 70 and U.S. Route 54 were left unstaffed by U.S. Customs and Border Protection as part of the temporary closure of all six checkpoints in the El Paso Sector, which covers West Texas and New Mexico. The county was concerned about the possibility of illegal narcotics flowing north unchecked since the checkpoint agents had been shifted to the border to help process migrant asylum-seekers. The inspection stations reopened August 5, 2019.

On Monday June 13, 2022, the county commissioners attracted nationwide attention by refusing to certify the results of the local 2022 primary election on June 7, 2022. In response, the New Mexico Secretary of State filed a lawsuit and writ of mandamus against the commissioners for their refusal. By Friday June 17, 2022, two of the three commissioners agreed to certify the election results, which defused the crisis.

Geography
It is the third-largest county in New Mexico by area.

Adjacent counties

 Doña Ana County – west
 Sierra County – northwest
 Lincoln County – north
 Chaves County – east
 Eddy County – east
 Culberson County, Texas – southeast
 Hudspeth County, Texas – south
 El Paso County, Texas – southwest

National protected areas
 Lincoln National Forest (part)
 White Sands National Park (part)

Demographics

2000 census
As of the 2000 census, there were 62,298 people, 22,984 households, and 16,801 families living in the county. The population density was 9 people per square mile (4/km2). There were 29,272 housing units at an average density of 4 per square mile (2/km2). The racial makeup of the county was 73.71% White, 3.92% Black or African American, 5.80% Native American, 1.17% Asian, 0.13% Pacific Islander, 11.67% from other races, and 3.60% from two or more races. 32.16% of the population were Hispanic or Latino of any race.

There were 22,984 households, out of which 37.10% had children under the age of 18 living with them, 57.50% were married couples living together, 11.80% had a female householder with no husband present, and 26.90% were non-families. 23.30% of all households were made up of individuals, and 8.10% had someone living alone who was 65 years of age or older. The average household size was 2.66 and the average family size was 3.14.

In the county, the population was spread out, with 29.50% under the age of 18, 9.30% from 18 to 24, 28.60% from 25 to 44, 21.00% from 45 to 64, and 11.70% who were 65 years of age or older. The median age was 34 years. For every 100 females there were 99.00 males. For every 100 females age 18 and over, there were 96.80 males.

The median income for a household in the county was $30,861, and the median income for a family was $34,781. Males had a median income of $27,657 versus $18,470 for females. The per capita income for the county was $14,345. About 15.60% of families and 19.30% of the population were below the poverty line, including 27.90% of those under age 18 and 12.80% of those age 65 or over.

2010 census
As of the 2010 census, there were 63,797 people, 24,464 households, and 16,641 families living in the county. The racial makeup of the county was 72.7% white, 6.7% American Indian, 3.5% black or African American, 1.2% Asian, 0.2% Pacific islander, 11.5% from other races, and 4.2% from two or more races. Those of Hispanic or Latino origin made up 34.5% of the population. In terms of ancestry, 13.4% were German, 8.1% were English, 8.0% were Irish, and 4.4% were American.

Of the 24,464 households, 33.3% had children under the age of 18 living with them, 50.2% were married couples living together, 12.7% had a female householder with no husband present, 32.0% were non-families, and 27.1% of all households were made up of individuals. The average household size was 2.51 and the average family size was 3.05. The median age was 36.5 years.

The median income for a household in the county was $39,615 and the median income for a family was $46,210. Males had a median income of $32,939 versus $25,965 for females. The per capita income for the county was $19,255. About 15.2% of families and 20.0% of the population were below the poverty line, including 28.0% of those under age 18 and 13.5% of those age 65 or over.

Education
School districts in the county include:
 Alamogordo Public Schools
 Cloudcroft Municipal Schools
 Gadsden Independent Schools
 Tularosa Municipal Schools

Tribal schools affiliated with the Bureau of Indian Education (BIE):
 Mescalero Apache Schools

State-operated schools:
 New Mexico School for the Blind and Visually Impaired

Schools operated by foreign governments:
 Deutsche Schule Alamogordo (closed)

Tertiary:
 New Mexico State University Alamogordo

Public libraries:
 Alamogordo Public Library

Communities

City
 Alamogordo (county seat)

Villages
 Cloudcroft
 Tularosa

Census-designated places

 Bent
 Boles Acres
 Chaparral
 High Rolls
 Holloman AFB
 La Luz
 Mayhill
 Mescalero
 Orogrande
 Piñon
 Sacramento
 Timberon
 Twin Forks
 Weed

Other communities
 Hortonville
 Mountain Park
 Newman
 Sunspot
 Three Rivers

Other places
 Mescalero Apache Indian Reservation
 National Solar Observatory
 Otero County Prison Facility
 White Sands National Park
 White Sands Ranch (private land)

Politics and government
Governance of the county is under a three-member county commission.

County commissioner Couy Griffin
In early 2021, Commissioner Couy Griffin, a former street preacher, was banned from entering the sizable Mescalero Apache Reservation in his own jurisdiction, because he participated in the January 6 United States Capitol attack. On January 19, the other two commissioners called for his resignation.

In a bench trial on March 21, 2022, Griffin was convicted of trespassing, but acquitted on the more serious charge of disorderly conduct. In 2022, the county commission refused to certify primary election results. After a court order from the New Mexico state Supreme Court, the commission eventually did certify the election results, but Commissioner Griffin continued with his refusal, voting "No". Commissioner Griffin justified his refusal by saying, "My vote to just remain a no isn't based on any evidence. It's not based on any facts, it's only based on my gut feeling and my own intuition, and that's all I need".

On September 6, 2022, Griffin became the first public official in more than a century to be debarred from office under the Fourteenth Amendment to the United States Constitution. The debarment from holding public office is "for life".

Stephanie Dubois, the Democratic candidate for Otero County District 2 Commission, was appointed by Governor Michelle Lynn Lujan Grisham and sworn in October 28, 2022. Dubois was facing Republican Amy Barela and the appointment took place in the final weeks of the election to replace Couy Griffin for the District 2, Otero County, New Mexico Commission Seat. The County leans heavily Republican. Barela won the November general election.

See also
 National Register of Historic Places listings in Otero County, New Mexico

References

Further reading
 

 
1899 establishments in New Mexico Territory
Populated places established in 1899